Lukas Hinterseer (born 28 March 1991) is an Austrian professional footballer who plays as a forward for  club Hansa Rostock.

Born in Kitzbühel, Tyrol, Hinterseer began his career at local club FC Kitzbühel before signing for FC Wacker Innsbruck in 2008. After initially struggling to make the first team, he experienced a breakthrough in the 2013–14 season. His form earned him a move to German football, where he played for FC Ingolstadt, VfL Bochum, Hamburger SV, Hannover 96 and Hansa Rostock.

Hinterseer made his senior debut for Austria in November 2013 after previously being capped by Austria youth teams at under-17, under-18 and under-19 levels. He was chosen in Austria's squad for the UEFA Euro 2016.

Club career

Early years
Lukas Hinterseer, nephew of famous alpine skier and singer Hansi Hinterseer and grandson of Olympic slalom winner Ernst Hinterseer, began his active career as a football player relatively late at the age of ten with his home club, FC Kitzbühel. 

There, he progressed through all youth levels before receiving an offer from FC Wacker Innsbruck, joining the youth academy of the club based in the Tyrol capital. He played most of the 2008–09 season with the Wacker U19 team, but also appeared for the club's second team, which at that time was still competing in the fourth-tier Tiroler Liga. There, the Kitzbühel native gained his first experience in senior football and sat on the bench on 9 August 2008 in a 1–2 away win over Innsbrucker AC.
In his following match with the first team, Hinterseer eventually made his debut, on 11 October 2008 in a 0–0 draw against SV Längenfeld, where he made the start and was replaced in the 81st minute by Daniel Niederjaufner. 

In his third appearance in the second team, he scored a goal in a 9–0 win over SC Kirchberg on 21 March 2009. In the remainder of the season, he scored goals in wins over SK Jenbach and SV Längenfeld again. He finished the season with 11 appearances for the second team in which he scored four goals, as Wacker Innsbruck II won the championship title in the fourth tier. The team, which suffered only one defeat in the entire season, had already secured promotion a few matchdays before the end.

Wacker Innsbruck

Professional debut

At the beginning of the 2009–10 season, Hinterseer signed his first professional contract with Wacker Innsbruck, after which he would play sporadically for the professional outfit, but also still make appearances with the amateur second team. After promotion was reached to the Austrian Regionalliga West, the striker became a feared goalscorer for the second team, where he scored seven goals in a total of 19 Regionalliga appearances. He also made his professional debut in the second-tier Austrian Football First League for the Wacker first team against the Red Bull Salzburg reserve team, FC Liefering, on 14 July 2009. In the match, he came on as a substitute for fellow striker Markus Unterrainer in the 71st minute. This was followed by a further seven first team league appearances for Hinterseer over the season, where he came on as a substitute player and mostly only appeared for a few minutes of play. In a 0–3 away win over FC Dornbirn on 20 March 2010, his longest showing of the season occurred at just under half an hour, in which he managed to score his first professional goal in the 69th minute. 

In his last appearance in the Second League on 9 April 2010, he scored the only goal of the game with a 1–0 home win over FC Lustenau 07 in the 94th minute of the match after pass from Georg Harding. At the end of the 2009–10 season, he achieved promotion to the Austrian Football Bundesliga with Wacker again, after their relegation in the 2007–08 season. At the end of the season, being two points ahead of FC Admira Wacker Mödling was eventually enough for their renewed promotion to the Bundesliga.

In the 2010–11 season, Hinterseer could also not really assert himself in the first team and only made three short Bundesliga appearances. He made his Bundesliga debut exactly one year after his last professional appearance, on 9 April 2011 in a 1–0 win over Wiener Neustadt. In the match, he came on as a substitute in the 90th minute for his striker colleague Julius Perstaller. 

Only in the last two rounds of the season did head coach Walter Kogler utilise him more than hitherto. On 22 May 2011, he made a 38-minute appearance against LASK (1–0 win) when he came on as a substitute for Perstaller. Hinterseer was also used as the sole striker in the season finale against SK Sturm Graz, which saw Sturm become the 2010–11 Austrian Football Bundesliga champions. In this encounter, he recorded his first appearance in the starting lineup of the first team, before he was replaced in the 56th minute by Carlos Merino. Parallel to his tenure with the first team, he made 20 appearances for the second team in the Regionalliga West, in which he scored eight goals as Wacker II achieved a midtable finish.

Loans to Lustenau and First Vienna
After struggling to make the first team regularly, Hinterseer was sent on loans to FC Lustenau 07 in spring 2012 and later First Vienna FC for fall 2012.

Return to Innsbruck
After his return from First Vienna in January 2013, Hinterseer developed into a regular starter for Wacker Innsbruck and was able to contribute with six goals in total (3 goals, 3 assists) in 13 appearances. In the 2013–14 season he finally became a key player of the team; mainly used in attacking midfield and as a false 9. Due to his convincing performances, national team coach Marcel Koller called him up for the Austria national team.

Germany
On 6 May 2014, Lukas Hinterseer signed a three-year contract with FC Ingolstadt 04 in the German Bundesliga. He scored the winning goal to make it 1-0 in the 66th minute on 15 August 2015 in an away match against 1. FSV Mainz 05, he scored his first, as well as Ingolstadt's first, Bundesliga goal. On 5 April 2016, he extended his contract until 2017.

After the end of the 2016–17 season, and the relegation of Ingolstadt to the 2. Bundesliga, Hinterseer's contract was not extended, and he subsequently joined fellow second-tier club VfL Bochum on a free transfer. There, he made his debut in a 1–1 draw against MSV Duisburg on 5 August 2017, the second matchday of the 2017–18 season. In a 5–2 win against FC Nöttingen in the first main round of the 2017–18 DFB-Pokal on 13 August 2017, he scored his first three competitive goals for Bochum. His contract, which expired at the end of the 2018–19 2. Bundesliga season, was not renewed. He finished his stint at Bochum with 32 goals in 62 league appearances, on average scoring in every second game for the club.

On 25 May 2019, Hinterseer joined Hamburger SV on a two-year deal.

Ulsan Hyundai
On 22 January 2021, Hinterseer signed with K League club Ulsan Hyundai.

Hannover 96
After half a year in South Korea, Hinterseer returned to Germany and signed a two-year contract with 2. Bundesliga club Hannover 96.

Hansa Rostock
On 21 July 2022, Hinterseer transferred to Hansa Rostock on a two-year contract.

International career

Austria under-17 coach Paul Gludovatz selected Hinterseer for the U17 squad while he was still in Kitzbühel. With the team he took part in the Toto Youth Cup in 2007. There, he was used in the various matches and was able to defend the title with the Austrians at the end of the competition. In the following year, the striker was regularly called up for the Austria under-18 team, although under coach Andreas Heraf he was mostly only called up and later not included in the official team. Furthermore, Hinterseer was called up for the Austria U19 squad, although he did not contribute as a regular.

After his definitive breakthrough in the 2013–14 season, he made his debut for the senior team under national team coach Marcel Koller in a 1–0 win over the United States on 19 November 2013.

For the UEFA Euro 2016 in France, Hinterseer was named in Austria's 23-man squad. He made his only tournament appearance in the 0–0 draw against Portugal in the second game, when he came on as a substitute in the final minutes. Austria were knocked out of the tournament in the group stage.

Personal life
Lukas Hinterseer is the grandson of former Olympic champion and World Cup winner, alpine skier Ernst Hinterseer and also the nephew of singer and former alpine skier Hansi Hinterseer.

Career statistics

Honours
Wacker Innsbruck II
 Tiroler Liga (IV): 2008–09

Wacker Innsbruck
 First League (II): 2009–10

FC Ingolstadt
 2. Bundesliga (II): 2014–15

References

External links

 
 
 

1991 births
Living people
Austrian footballers
Austria youth international footballers
Austria international footballers
Austrian expatriate footballers
Austrian Football Bundesliga players
2. Liga (Austria) players
Austrian Regionalliga players
Bundesliga players
2. Bundesliga players
K League 1 players
FC Wacker Innsbruck (2002) players
FC Lustenau players
First Vienna FC players
FC Ingolstadt 04 players
VfL Bochum players
Hamburger SV players
Ulsan Hyundai FC players
Hannover 96 players
FC Hansa Rostock players
Expatriate footballers in Germany
Expatriate footballers in South Korea
UEFA Euro 2016 players
Association football forwards
Austrian expatriate sportspeople in Germany
Austrian expatriate sportspeople in South Korea
People from Kitzbühel
Footballers from Tyrol (state)